MV Venus may refer to a number of ships.

 , launched in 1939 as Empire Jonquil
 , the summer name of the MV Black Prince between 1970 and 1985
 MV Venus, a Philippine ferry that sank in 1984.
  a ship hijacked by pirates in January, 2009

Ship names